Shashur or Sashur Monastery  is a  Buddhist monastery of the Drugpa sect in Lahaul and Spiti,  Himachal Pradesh, northern India. It is located 137 kilometres from Manali.  Sha-shur means "blue pines" in the local dialect, as  patches of blue pine can be seen around the monastery. A smaller gompa had existed previous to the current building. In the month of June or July Chham is performed in the monastery.

Footnotes

References

Buddhist monasteries in Himachal Pradesh
Drukpa Kagyu monasteries and temples
Tibetan Buddhist monasteries and temples in India
Buddhism in Lahaul and Spiti district
Buildings and structures in Lahaul and Spiti district